Romain Argyroudis (born 6 November 1946 in Mulhouse) is a French former footballer of Greek descent who played for clubs in both countries.

A forward in the 1960s and 1970s, Argyroudis played for a number of clubs in France, including Mulhouse, Lens (two spells, 1968 to 1969 and 1973 to 1979) and Nice (1969 to 1971). In 1971, he along with fellow French-Greek forward Yves Triantafillos joined Greek club Olympiacos. In the 1972–73 season he won the double with Olympiacos. He left the club at the end of the season and rejoined Lens.

Personal life
His grandfather was from Eptanese in Greece and emigrated to Montevideo. His grandmother was Uruguayan, while his mother is French.

References

Profile

1946 births
Living people
French footballers
Olympiacos F.C. players
RC Lens players
FC Mulhouse players
OGC Nice players
Ligue 1 players
Ligue 2 players
Super League Greece players
French people of Greek descent
Footballers from Mulhouse
French people of Uruguayan descent
Association football forwards